JDV may refer to:

Jason de Vos, a Canadian soccer player
Jeffrey de Visscher, a Dutch footballer
Jose de Venecia, Jr., a Filipino politician
Jean de Villiers, a South African rugby player
Jnana Deepa, Institute of Philosophy and Theology, Pune, India (Pontifical  Athenaeum)
Joe Devance, a Filipino basketball player
DjVu, document file format